Hela is a province of Papua New Guinea. The provincial capital is Tari. The province covers an area of 10,498 km², and there are 249,449 inhabitants (2011 census figures). Hela province officially came into being on 17 May 2012, comprising three districts previously part of Southern Highlands Province.

Districts and LLGs
There were three districts in the province. However, one new electorate known as Komo Hulia LLG was approved in April 2022 and will go for first election in 28th April 2022 after splitting the Komo-Margarima Electorate. Each district has one or more Local Level Government (LLG) areas. For census purposes, the LLG areas are subdivided into wards and those into census units.

Provincial leaders

Chairmen of the Hela Transitional Authority (2010–2012)

Governors (2012–present)

Members of the National Parliament

The province and each district is represented by a Member of the National Parliament.  There is one provincial electorate and each district is an open electorate.

References

 
Provinces of Papua New Guinea
Highlands Region
States and territories established in 2012
2012 establishments in Papua New Guinea